The Ministry of Finance is a department of the Syrian Government.

Responsibilities
It is a ministry that deals with the preparation of the state's financial policies, the supervision of their implementation by monitoring and collecting public revenues to the state treasury, the supervision of the payment of state expenditures and organizations, and the preparation of the state budget. He is also responsible for managing public debt in cooperation with the Central Bank of Syria.

Ministers 

Said Choucair, 1918-1920
Fares al-Khoury, 1920
Hamdi Al-Nasr, 1920-1922
Mohammed Ali Bey al-Abed, 1922-1925
Jalal Zuhdi, 1925-1926
Shaker Nemat Al-Shabani, 1926
Abdul Qadir Al-Azm, 1926
Hamdi Al-Nasr, 1926-1928
Jamil al-Ulshi, 1928-1931	
Tawfiq Shamia, 1931-1932	
Jamil Mardam, 1932-1933	
Shakir Al-Shabani, 1933-1934	
Hinri Hindia, 1934-1936	
Edmond Al-Homsi, 1936
Shukri al-Quwwatli, 1936-1938
Lutfi al-Haffar, 1938
Fayez al-Khoury, 1939-1939	
Muhammad Khalil Mudaris, 1939
Hosni Al-Bitar, 1939-1941	
Nin Sehnaoui, 1941	
Fayez al-Khoury, 1941-1943	
Mustafa al-Shihabi, 1943
Khalid al-Azm, 1943-1945	
Naim Antaki, 1945	
Khalid al-Azm, 1945	
Naim Antaki, 1945-1946	
Edmond Al-Homsi, 1946	
Said Ghazzi, 1946-1947	
Wehbe Hariri, 1947-1948	
Hassan Jabara, 1948-1949	
Khalid al-Azm, 1949	
Abdul Rahman Al-Azm, 1949-1950	
Hassan Jabara, 1950	
Shakir Alas, 1950-1951	
Abdul Rahman Al-Azm, 1951	
Hassan al-Hakim, 1951	
Shakir Alas, 1951-1952	
Saeed Al-Zaeem, 1952-1953	
George Shahin, 1953-1954	
Abdul Rahman Al-Azm, 1954
Izzat Al-Saqal, 1954	
Rizqallah Antaki, 1954-1955	
Lyon Zomria, 1955
Abd al-Wahhab Hawmad, 1955-1956	
Sabri al-Asali, 1956
Asad Mohsen, 1956-1958	
Fakhir Alkiali, 1958	
Abdel Wahab Homed, 1958-1960
Naaman W. AZHARI, 1961-1962	
Abd al-Wahhab Hawmad, 1963
Mustafa ash-Shamma, 1963-1964
Abd al-Fattah Bushi, 1964-1965
Muwaffaq al-Shurbaji, 1965-1969
Nurallah Nurallah, 1969-1974
Muhammad al-Sharif, 1974-1976
Sadiq al-Ayyubi, 1976-1980	
Hamdi al-Saqqa, 1980-1985	
Qahtan Al-Sioufi, 1985-1987	
Khalid al-Mahayni, 1987-2001
Mohammad al-Atrash, 2001-2003
Mohammad al-Hussein, 2003-2011	
Mohammad al Jililati, 2011-2014	
Ismael Ismael, 2014-2016	
Maamoun Hamdan, 2016-2020	
Kenan Yaghi, 2020-incumbent

References

See also
Government ministries of Syria
Central Bank of Syria
Economy of Syria

Government ministries of Syria
Syria
Ministries established in 1918
Organizations based in Damascus